Yordan Anev (born 23 August 1973) is a Bulgarian wrestler. He competed in the men's Greco-Roman 52 kg at the 1996 Summer Olympics.

References

External links
 

1973 births
Living people
Bulgarian male sport wrestlers
Olympic wrestlers of Bulgaria
Wrestlers at the 1996 Summer Olympics
People from Peshtera